Brice Jovial (born 25 January 1984) is a former professional footballer who played as a striker. Born in metropolitan France, he played for the Guadeloupe national team.

International goals

References

 Brice Jovial est Zèbre!

External links
 
 

1984 births
Living people
French footballers
Sportspeople from Aubervilliers
French people of Guadeloupean descent
Racing Club de France Football players
Empoli F.C. players
AS Cannes players
R. Charleroi S.C. players
Association football forwards
US Sénart-Moissy players
AS Beauvais Oise players
Le Havre AC players
Dijon FCO players
Chengdu Tiancheng F.C. players
Wuhan F.C. players
China League One players
Ligue 1 players
Ligue 2 players
Belgian Pro League players
Expatriate footballers in Belgium
Expatriate footballers in China
Guadeloupean footballers
Guadeloupe international footballers
2011 CONCACAF Gold Cup players
Guadeloupean expatriate footballers
Guadeloupean expatriates in Belgium
Guadeloupean expatriates in China
Footballers from Seine-Saint-Denis